The Intervention Board for Agricultural Produce was a public authority in the United Kingdom from 1972 until 2001.

The Board was formed as a Government Department on 22 November 1972, under section 6 of the European Communities Act 1972, and was responsible under the Agriculture Ministers for the implementation of the guarantee functions of the Common Agricultural Policy. Policy matters remained the responsibility of the Agriculture Ministers.

The Board was abolished with effect from  14 November 2001 and its property, rights and liabilities transferred to the Secretary of State, the Scottish Ministers, the National Assembly for Wales and the Department for Agriculture and Rural Development in Northern Ireland.

References

1972 establishments in the United Kingdom
2001 disestablishments in the United Kingdom